Donald Guthrie (February 21, 1916 – September 8, 1992) was a British New Testament scholar, best known for his New Testament Introduction (1962) and New Testament Theology (1981) which are recognized as significant books related to the New Testament.

Life 
Guthrie studied on the Bachelor of Divinity programme at London Bible College (now London School of Theology), which was accredited by the University of London. Before completing his degree, Guthrie began lecturing at the college, at the invitation of the college's principal, Ernest Kevan. He continued lecturing at the college until his retirement in 1982, becoming Vice-Principal in 1978. He then served as President of the college from 1983 until his death.

Works

Books

Articles

Festschrift

References

External links
 Donald Guthrie

1916 births
1992 deaths
British theologians
British biblical scholars
Alumni of the University of London
Alumni of the London School of Theology
Writers from Ipswich
New Testament scholars